The Republican Party of New Mexico is the affiliate of the United States Republican Party in New Mexico. It is headquartered in Albuquerque and led by Chair Steve Pearce, Vice Chair Frank Trambley, Secretary Mari Trujillo Spinelli, and Treasurer David Chavez.

It is the primary opposition to the Democratic Party of New Mexico. The party has provided 12 of the 31 Governors of New Mexico, including three since the 1990s (Susana Martinez, Gary Johnson, and Garrey Carruthers). Other key Republican figures in New Mexico's history include Lew Wallace, José Francisco Chaves, Miguel Antonio Otero, Elfego Baca, Octaviano Ambrosio Larrazolo, and Edwin L. Mechem.

History 

Like most other state Republican parties, the Republican Party of New Mexico was founded during the American Civil War Era in the recently acquired Territory of New Mexico. The State of New Mexico was created in 1912. One of the founding fathers of the Republican Party of New Mexico was Thomas B. Catron. At the time of New Mexico's admission to the Union, Catron owned a significant majority of land in the state. Due to that wealth, Catron was influential in shaping the party. Catron served as U.S. Senator from New Mexico from 1912 to 1917.

Former Republican Governor of New Mexico, Gary Johnson, ran for the party's nomination for president in the 2012 Republican presidential primary. He was governor of New Mexico from 1995 to 2003. However, poll numbers showed Johnson well behind the other Republican candidates and he was only included in two debates with his opponents. This was partly the reason he switched to the Libertarian Party and continued his presidential run for that party's nomination. He won the nomination by a landslide and went on to win third place in the 2012 presidential election behind 1st-place finisher incumbent Democratic President Barack Obama and 2nd-place finisher the (Republican) former Massachusetts Governor Mitt Romney. He won nearly 1% nationwide and slightly above 3% in New Mexico.

2020 election 
Once Joe Biden defeated Donald Trump in the 2020 presidential election, the New Mexico GOP attempted to reject or question the election results. Shortly after the election the New Mexico Republican Party began raising funds to help Trump and his campaign challenge the election results. In a November 19 statement, the state GOP falsely claimed that voter fraud occurred in the state, alleging that there was "manipulation of Dominion Voting Systems machines, illegal absentee ballots, ballots submitted with no applications and illegal actions against GOP poll challengers."

On December 14, 2020, the same day that New Mexico electors cast their electoral college votes, the Trump campaign filed a lawsuit in federal court against New Mexico Secretary of State, Maggie Toulouse Oliver, the electors of New Mexico and the State Canvassing Board. In a news release, the state GOP questioned the validity of the presidential election results and said it was working with the Trump campaign.

The New Mexico GOP supported a meeting of unofficial pro-Trump Republican electors that gathered at the state capitol on the 14th of December. Also in December 2020, the New Mexico GOP issued a statement supporting the Texas vs. Pennsylvania lawsuit seeking to reject certification of President-elect Biden's victory in four states, citing false claims of fraud.

In early January 2021, Rep. Cathrynn Brown proposed legislation to decertify Biden's victory in New Mexico by removing the state's five electoral votes he won, citing baseless claims of election fraud in New Mexico and in other states. The New Mexico GOP expressed support for the legislation. On January 7, 2021, New Mexico GOP chair Steve Pearce drew criticism when he claimed that alleged irregularities in the election "tarnished" democracy, soon after Biden's electoral victory was certified by Congress.

Pre-primary convention

Every two years, prior to the primary election, the party holds a pre-primary convention. This is where statewide candidates push to receive delegate support before the primary election. If a candidate receives at least 20% of the delegates vote, they are automatically placed on the primary election ballot. However, if a candidate does not receive at least 20% of the delegation vote, they can still get on the ballot by obtaining at least 1,500 signatures of Republicans who had voted in the most recent election within 10 days of the convention.

Current elected officials
The party controls none of the state's seven statewide offices, holds a minority in the New Mexico Senate, and a minority in the New Mexico House of Representatives. Republicans hold one of the state's three U.S. House seats.

Members of Congress

U.S. Senate
None
Both of New Mexico's U.S. Senate seats have been held by Democrats since 2009. Pete Domenici was the last Republican to represent New Mexico in the U.S. Senate. First elected in 1972, Domenici opted to retire instead of seeking a seventh term. Congressman Steve Pearce ran as the Republican nominee in the 2008 election and was subsequently defeated by Democratic challenger Tom Udall who has held the seat since.

U.S. House of Representatives
None

Republicans hold none of New Mexico's three congressional districts since 2022.

Statewide offices
None

New Mexico has not elected any GOP candidates to statewide office since 2014, when Susana Martinez was re-elected as governor.  In 2018, term limits prevented Martinez from seeking re-election to a third term. Congressman Steve Pearce ran as the Republican nominee in the 2018 election and was subsequently defeated by Democratic challenger Michelle Lujan Grisham.

List of past chairs
 John Dendahl (1994 – 2003)
 Ramsey Gorham (2003 – 2004)
 Allen Weh (2004 – 2009)
 Harvey Yates (2009 – 2010)
 Monty Newman (2010 – 2012)
 John Billingsley (2012 – 2014)
 Debbie Maestas (2015 – 2016)
 Ryan Cangiolosi (2016 – 2018)
 Steve Pearce (2018 – present)

Election results

Presidential

Gubernatorial

References

External links
 Republican Party of New Mexico

Political parties in New Mexico
New Mexico